Spatuloricaria caquetae, sometimes known as the longtail pleco, is a species of catfish in the family Loricariidae. It is native to South America, where it occurs in the Orteguaza River basin in Colombia. The species reaches 37 cm (14.6 inches) in length.

References 

Fish described in 1943
Taxa named by Henry Weed Fowler
Loricariini
Catfish of South America
Fish of Colombia